USS Hyacinth was a steamer  acquired by the Union during the American Civil War. She was placed into service as a tugboat, a dispatch boat, as well as a gunboat, by the Union Army and by the Union Navy.

Service history
Hyacinth was a tug used by the Union Army under the name Spitfire on the upper Mississippi River in 1862. She was used to carry dispatches during the Battle of Island Number Ten in March 1862.  She captured Confederate transport Sovereign near Fort Pillow, Tennessee, 5 June 1862; and 9 days later, took steamer Clara Dolsen after a long chase from Helena, Arkansas, ending on the White River a short distance above its mouth.

Spitfire was transferred by the U.S. War Department to the Union Navy 30 September 1862, and renamed Hyacinth 19 October. Hyacinth served the Mississippi Squadron until the end of the war. She was especially useful in operations which resulted in the fall of Vicksburg, and assisted in the salvage work which refloated Indianola.

She was sold at public auction at Mound City, Illinois, to A. T. Paine 17 August 1865.

References
 

Ships of the Union Navy
Steamships of the United States Navy
Gunboats of the United States Navy
Tugs of the United States Navy
American Civil War patrol vessels of the United States
1850s ships